Ciclotel was a Belgian women's road bicycle racing team, established in 2019, which participates in elite women's races.

Team roster

References

External links

UCI Women's Teams
Cycling teams based in Belgium
Cycling teams established in 2019